Juan Manuel Tévez (born August 28, 1987 in Puerto Belgrano (Buenos Aires), Argentina) is an Argentine footballer currently playing for Aucas of the Primera División in Ecuador.

Teams
  Guillermo Brown 2008-2013
  Talleres de Córdoba 2013-2014
  Unión La Calera 2014–2015
  Guillermo Brown 2015
  Coquimbo Unido 2016
  Macará 2017
  Aucas 2018–2019
  Universidad Católica 2020–2021
  Aucas 2022–

References
 Profile at BDFA 
 

1987 births
Living people
Argentine footballers
Argentine expatriate footballers
Guillermo Brown footballers
Talleres de Córdoba footballers
Unión La Calera footballers
Coquimbo Unido footballers
C.S.D. Macará footballers
Chilean Primera División players
Expatriate footballers in Chile
Expatriate footballers in Ecuador

Association footballers not categorized by position
Footballers from Buenos Aires